Marvin Goldman (born May 2, 1928 in New York City) is an American radiation biologist, known for "his highly significant contributions to the understanding of the effects of bone-seeking radionuclides—in carcinogenic characteristics of long-term strontium-90 exposures."

Education and career
Marvin Goldman grew up in Brooklyn and graduated from Erasmus Hall High School. He received in 1949 a bachelor's degree in biology from Adelphi College (now named Adelphi University) and in 1949 an M.S. in zoology-physiology from the University of Maryland, College Park. From 1949 to 1951 at the University of Maryland he was a graduate student supported by a fellowship to study aviation physiology. In 1951 he began working in Operation Buster–Jangle at the Nevada Test Site to determine the pulmonary effects in animals exposed to fallout from nuclear weapons tests. In 1951, with two colleagues, he made the first detection of plutonium in lung tissue from animals that inhaled dust from U.S. nuclear bomb tests. After leaving the Nevada Test Site, he completed in 1957 his Ph.D. in radiation biology at the University of Rochester. His thesis advisor was Newell Stannard.

In December 1958 Goldman, with his wife and new-born child, moved to Davis, California; the University of California, Davis (UC Davis) hired him as a radiation biologist. He worked on a long-term project to determine the effects on beagles of low-level, chronic exposure to strontium-90.

He has "consulted for the European Commission, the White House, NASA and the U.S. Department of Energy." His research in pollutant toxicity and radiation biology includes "long-term effects of strontium-90 and radium-226; hot particles; the effects of fossil-fuel effluents; biomedical models for risk assessment; toxicity of organophosphate agents; whole-body counting and gamma ray spectrometry; thermoluminescent dosimetry; and radiation effects on cells." He holds a patent in X-ray fluorescent spectrometry and is the author or co-author of more than 100 articles.

In 1972 Goldman was one of five recipients of the Ernest Orlando Lawrence Award from the Atomic Energy Commission. For the academic year 1994–1995 he was the president of the Health Physics Society. In 1996 he was elected a fellow of the American Association for the Advancement of Science.

Selected publications
 
 
 
 
 
 
 
 
 
  1988
 
  1996

References

1928 births
Living people
Erasmus Hall High School alumni
Adelphi University alumni
University of Maryland, College Park alumni
University of Rochester alumni
University of California, Davis faculty
Fellows of the American Association for the Advancement of Science
Health physicists
Health Physics Society